Ather El Tahir Babikir Mohamed (born 24 October 1996) is a Sudanese footballer who plays as a right-back for Sudanese club Al-Hilal Club and the Sudan national team.

Career statistics

International 

Scores and results list Sudan's goal tally first, score column indicates score after each El Tahir goal.

References

External links
 
 
 
 

1996 births
Living people
People from Khartoum
Sudanese footballers
Association football fullbacks
Al-Hilal Club (Omdurman) players
Smouha SC players
Sudan Premier League players
Egyptian Premier League players
Sudanese expatriate footballers
Sudanese expatriate sportspeople in Egypt
Expatriate footballers in Egypt
Sudan A' international footballers
2018 African Nations Championship players